The 2009 CV Whitney Cup was played at Florida's International Polo Club, as a World Polo Tour Cup event, February 38th-March 9, 2009.

Participating teams

Results

First round

Date  	Time  	Teams

Sat. 	Feb. 28 	3:00 pm 	Pony Express def. Las Monjitas 	12-11 in OT

Sun. 	Mar. 1 	12:00 pm 	Lechuza Caracas def. Orchard Hill 	14-13 in OT

3:00 pm 	Audi def. White Birch 	11-10

Semifinals
Wed. 	Mar. 4 	1:00 pm
Audi def. Zacara
15-13

3:00 pm
Lechuza Caracas def. Pony Express
14-7

Consolation Cup
Thu. 	Mar. 5 	3:00 pm 	Semifinal:
Las Monjitas def. Orchard Hill
9-7

Sun. 	Mar. 8 	12:00 pm 	IPC Cup Final:
Las Monjitas vs. White Birch
The game was stopped after Mariano Aguerre suffered an injury in the first chukker and a substitute was unavailable.

Final
3:00 pm 	CV Whitney Final
Audi def. Lechuza Caracas
8-7

See also
 C.V. Whitney Cup

External links
 International Polo Club
 La Bocha

Polo competitions in the United States
Cv Whitney Cup, 2009